Rosario Navas Morata is a diplomat for Cuba.

At the age of 28, she became the first secretary of the Cuban embassy in Angola, then she represented the country, inter alia, in Italy, Belgium, and the United States.

In 1994, she began service as an ambassador to Spain.

From 2006 to 2011, Morata was Cuba's ambassador extraordinary and plenipotentiary to Poland.

References

Cuban women ambassadors
Ambassadors of Cuba to Poland
Ambassadors of Cuba to Spain
Living people
Place of birth missing (living people)
Year of birth missing (living people)